Neuralink Corporation is an American neurotechnology company that develops implantable brain–computer interfaces (BCIs) based in Fremont, California. Founded by Elon Musk and a team of seven scientists and engineers, Neuralink was launched in 2016 and was first publicly reported in March 2017.

Since its founding, the company has hired several high-profile neuroscientists from various universities. By July 2019, it had received $158 million in funding (of which $100 million was from Musk) and was employing a staff of 90 employees. At that time, Neuralink announced that it was working on a "sewing machine-like" device capable of implanting very thin (4 to 6 μm in width) threads into the brain, and demonstrated a system that read information from a lab rat via 1,500 electrodes. They had anticipated starting experiments with humans in 2020, but have since moved that projection to 2023.

Several neuroscientists and publications, including the MIT Technology Review, have been critical of claims made by Musk about Neuralink, calling some of the technological promises "highly speculative". In March 2023, Reuters reported that the Food and Drug Administration rejected a 2022 application for human trials.

Company

History 
Neuralink was founded in 2016 by Elon Musk and a founding team of seven scientists and engineers. The group of initial hires consisted of experts in areas such as neuroscience, biochemistry and robotics. The trademark "Neuralink" was purchased from its previous owners in January 2017.

In April 2017, Neuralink announced that it was aiming to make devices to treat serious brain diseases in the short-term, with the eventual goal of human enhancement, sometimes called transhumanism. Musk had said his interest in the idea partly stemmed from the science fiction concept of "neural lace" in the fictional universe in The Culture, a series of 10 novels by Iain M. Banks.

Musk defined the neural lace as a "digital layer above the cortex" that would not necessarily imply extensive surgical insertion but ideally an implant through a vein or artery. He said the long-term goal is to achieve "symbiosis with artificial intelligence", which he perceives as an existential threat to humanity if it goes unchecked. He believes the device will be "something analogous to a video game, like a saved game situation, where you are able to resume and upload your last state" and "address brain injuries or spinal injuries and make up for whatever lost capacity somebody has with a chip."

Neuralink is headquartered in Fremont, California. Jared Birchall, the head of Musk's family office, was listed as CEO, CFO and president of Neuralink in 2018. As of September 2018, Musk was the majority owner of Neuralink but did not hold an executive position.

By August 2020, only three of the eight founding scientists remained at the company, according to an article by Stat News which reported that Neuralink had seen "years of internal conflict in which rushed timelines have clashed with the slow and incremental pace of science."

In April 2021, Neuralink demonstrated a monkey playing the game "Pong" using the Neuralink implant. While similar technology has existed since 2002, when a research group first demonstrated a monkey moving a computer cursor with neural signals, scientists acknowledged the engineering progress in making the implant wireless and increasing the number of implanted electrodes.

In May 2021, co-founder and president Max Hodak announced that he no longer works with the company. As of January 2022, of the eight cofounders, only two remain at the company.

Culture criticism 
A January 2022 article in Fortune highlighted criticism of Neuralink's corporate culture from anonymous former employees. They described a "culture of blame and fear" and one with vacillating priorities. Additionally, Musk allegedly undermined management by encouraging junior employees "to email issues and complaints to him directly."

Technology 
In 2018, Gizmodo reported that Neuralink "remained highly secretive about its work", although public records showed that it had sought to open an animal testing facility in San Francisco; it subsequently started to carry out research at the University of California, Davis. In 2019, during a live presentation at the California Academy of Sciences, the Neuralink team revealed to the public the technology of the first prototype they had been working on. It is a system that involves ultra-thin probes that will be inserted into the brain, a neurosurgical robot that will perform the operations and a high-density electronic system capable of processing information from neurons.  It is based on technology developed at UCSF and UC Berkeley.

Probes 
The probes, composed mostly of polyimide, a biocompatible material, with a thin gold or platinum conductor, are inserted into the brain through an automated process performed by a surgical robot. Each probe consists of an area of wires that contains electrodes capable of locating electrical signals in the brain, and a sensory area where the wire interacts with an electronic system that allows amplification and acquisition of the brain signal. Each probe contains 48 or 96 wires, each of which contains 32 independent electrodes, making a system of up to 3072 electrodes per formation.

Robot 
Neuralink says they have engineered a surgical robot capable of rapidly inserting many flexible probes into the brain, which may avoid the problems of tissue damage and longevity issues associated with larger and more rigid probes. This surgical robot has an insertion head with a 40 μm diameter needle made of tungsten-rhenium designed to attach to the insertion loops, inject individual probes, and penetrate the meninges and cerebral tissue; it is capable of inserting up to six wires (192 electrodes) per minute.

Electronics 

Neuralink has developed an application-specific integrated circuit (ASIC) to create a 1,536-channel recording system. This system consists of 256 amplifiers capable of being individually programmed ("analog pixels"), analog-to-digital converters within the chip ("ADCs") and a peripheral circuit control to serialize the digitized information obtained. It aims to convert information obtained from neurons into an understandable binary code in order to achieve greater understanding of brain function and the ability to stimulate these neurons back. With the present technology, electrodes are still too big to record the firing of individual neurons, so they can record only the firing of a group of neurons; Neuralink representatives believe this issue might get mitigated algorithmically, but it is computationally expensive and does not produce exact results.

In July 2020, according to Musk, Neuralink obtained a FDA breakthrough device designation which allows limited human testing under the FDA guidelines for medical devices.

Animal testing 
Neuralink tests their devices by surgically implanting them in the brains of live monkeys, pigs and other animals.  Neuralink's methods have been criticized by groups such as PETA.

From 2017 to 2020, Neuralink's experiments on monkeys were conducted in partnership with UC Davis. At the end of their partnership, UC Davis transferred seven monkeys to Neuralink. In 2022, the Physicians Committee for Responsible Medicine (PCRM) alleged that Neuralink and UC Davis had mistreated several monkeys, subjecting them to psychological distress, extreme suffering, and chronic infections due to surgeries. Experiments conducted by Neuralink and UC Davis have involved at least 23 monkeys, and the PCRM believes that 15 of those monkeys died or were euthanized as a result of the experiments. Furthermore, the PCRM alleged that UC Davis withheld photographic and video evidence of the mistreatment.

In February 2022, Neuralink said that macaque monkeys died and were euthanized after experimentation, denying that any animal abuse had occurred.

Musk previously stated that Neuralink implants would be introduced by injecting them through the jugular vein, and not by opening the cranium (which Neuralink currently requires).

In December 2022, it was reported that Neuralink was under federal investigation by the United States Department of Agriculture (USDA) regarding animal welfare violations. Additionally, a report by Reuters cited claims from several Neuralink employees that testing was being rushed due to Musk's demands for fast results, which was leading to needless suffering and deaths among the animals.

Human testing 
The FDA rejected a 2022 application to pursue human clinical trials over "major safety concerns involving the device’s lithium battery; the potential for the implant’s tiny wires to migrate to other areas of the brain; and questions over whether and how the device can be removed without damaging brain tissue."

Reception 
Scientists have cited technical challenges for Neuralink. In 2017, a journalist at the IEEE Spectrum magazine had asked for comments from five researchers that had been working on BCI implants, including Thomas Oxley that invented the Stentrode. At a live demonstration in August 2020, Musk described their device as "a Fitbit in your skull". Several neuroscientists and publications criticized these claims. MIT Technology Review accused the demonstration of having the main objective to "stir excitement", adding that "Neuralink has provided no evidence that it can (or has even tried to) treat depression, insomnia, or a dozen other diseases that Musk mentioned in a slide". Andrew Jackson, professor of neural interfaces at Newcastle University, also commented on the presentation to the BBC. To Musk's statement that he found Neuralink's advancements to be "profound", Jackson responded, "I don't think there was anything revolutionary in the presentation."

Thiago Arzua of the Medical College of Wisconsin argued that Neuralink's functions are not novel and that ideas for a brain–machine interface (BMI) are at least 50 years old. He cited successful control of a robotic prosthetic arm by a man that gave him haptic feedback, which he used in 2016 to give President Obama a fist bump. Arzua said that the 2020 Neuralink presentation "showed little more than a flashy new design for a BMI with more electrodes".

See also 
 Brain–computer interface
 Cortical implant
 Kernel (neurotech company)
 Neurorobotics
 Surface chemistry of neural implants
 Stentrode

References

Further reading 
  (whitepaper)

External links 
  of Neuralink's presentation on July 16, 2019
  of Neuralink's presentation on December 1, 2022

Elon Musk
Transhumanism
Health care companies based in California
Brain–computer interfacing
2016 establishments in California
American companies established in 2016
Companies based in Fremont, California